Håkan Dahlby (born 15 September 1965) is a Swedish double trap shooter, the winner of the 2003, 2004, and 2012 European Championships. He won a silver medal at the 2012 Olympics after having the best final round of all finalists and moving from fifth to second place. In the 2004 Olympics he finished second in the qualification round, but dropped to fifth place during the final round. Since then, he has won the 2005 ISSF World Cup Final, the 2008 ISSF World Cup Final, and ISSF World Cup competitions in 2007 and 2008, but failed to reach the final at the 2008 Olympics. Dahlby lives in Stockholm.

Dahlby was a contestant in Let's Dance 2013.

External links 

 Profile at the Swedish Shooting Sport Federation

1965 births
Living people
Swedish male sport shooters
Shooters at the 2004 Summer Olympics
Shooters at the 2008 Summer Olympics
Shooters at the 2012 Summer Olympics
Shooters at the 2016 Summer Olympics
Olympic shooters of Sweden
Trap and double trap shooters
Olympic silver medalists for Sweden
Olympic medalists in shooting
Medalists at the 2012 Summer Olympics
Shooters at the 2015 European Games
European Games competitors for Sweden